The Presbyterian Church in Korea (JungAng) was formed when Pastor Baek Kee-Hwan left the HapDongJungAng. In 2004, it has 60,500 members and 355 congregations. It subscribes the Apostles Creed and Westminster Confession.

References

Presbyterian denominations in South Korea